Martin Zlomislić (born 16 August 1998) is a Bosnian professional footballer who plays as a goalkeeper for HNK Rijeka.

He started his professional career at Široki Brijeg in 2017, at the age of 19.

Club career

Široki Brijeg
Zlomislić started playing football in Široki Brijeg. He got called up to the first team in June 2017, but didn't make his professional debut for the club until 13 May 2018, which was a 3–1 home league win against Željezničar. Zlomislić didn't become a first team regular until the 2019–20 season, playing in 18 of Široki's 23 games in the first part of the season.

He started off the 2020–21 Bosnian Premier League season with a clean sheet in a 1–0 win against Tuzla City on 2 August 2020.

In a league game against Sloboda Tuzla on 29 August 2020, Zlomislić earned himself a straight red card after fouling an opposing player.

On 31 March 2021, he terminated his contract with Široki Brijeg and left the club.

International career
Zlomislić represented Bosnia and Herzegovina at under-19 and under-21 level, making 1 cap for the under-19 and 2 caps for the under-21 national team respectively.

Career statistics

Club

References

External links
Martin Zlomislić at UEFA
Martin Zlomislić at Sofascore

1998 births
Living people
People from Posušje
Bosnia and Herzegovina footballers
Premier League of Bosnia and Herzegovina players
Croatian Football League players
NK Široki Brijeg players
HNK Rijeka players
Bosnia and Herzegovina youth international footballers
Bosnia and Herzegovina under-21 international footballers
Association football goalkeepers